Stone–Tolan House is a historic home located at Brighton in Monroe County, New York. The 2-story frame house has a 1-story frame wing that is believed to have been built in 1792. It is a vernacular Federal-style structure and served as a frontier tavern, public meeting place, and pioneer homestead. The Landmark Society of Western New York acquired the property in 1956 to restore and preserve as a museum.

It was listed on the National Register of Historic Places in 1983.

See also
 List of the oldest buildings in the United States
 List of the oldest buildings in New York

References

External links
 Landmark Society Museums - Stone–Tolan House
 

Houses on the National Register of Historic Places in New York (state)
Historic American Buildings Survey in New York (state)
Historic house museums in New York (state)
Federal architecture in New York (state)
Houses completed in 1792
Museums in Monroe County, New York
Houses in Monroe County, New York
National Register of Historic Places in Monroe County, New York